Wayne Ferreira and Yevgeny Kafelnikov were the defending champions but lost in the first round to David Rikl and Daniel Vacek.

Mark Knowles and Daniel Nestor won in the final 6–2, 6–4 against Guy Forget and Jakob Hlasek.

Seeds
Champion seeds are indicated in bold text while text in italics indicates the round in which those seeds were eliminated. The top four seeded teams received byes into the second round.

Draw

Final

Top half

Bottom half

Qualifying

Seeds

Qualifiers

Qualifying draw

First qualifier

Second qualifier

References
 Official results archive (ATP)
 Official results archive (ITF)

1996 ATP Tour